Andrei Dobrokhodov (born 1 April 1984) is a former competitive figure skater who represented Azerbaijan. He is the 2005 Azerbaijan national champion and competed in the free skate at three World Junior Championships (2001–2003).

Programs

Results

References

External links
 

Azerbaijani male single skaters
1984 births
Living people
People from Pervouralsk
21st-century Azerbaijani people